Clinton McKinnon may refer to:

 Clinton McKinnon (musician)
Clinton D. McKinnon, politician